Constanța Burcică (née Pipotă; born 15 March 1971 in Sohatu, Călărași County) is a Romanian Olympic rower. She won the first three instances of the women's lightweight double scull at the Olympic regatta, in 1996, 2000 and 2004.

At the 1996 Olympics, Burcică and her partner Camelia Macoviciuc took the inaugural lightweight double scull event.

Burcică and her new partner Angela Alupei took the gold medal at the 2000 and 2004 Olympic Games in the women's lightweight double scull event. They also took first place at the Rowing World Cup twice in 2000, in Vienna, Austria and in Lucerne, Switzerland, and second place at the 2004 World Cup in Lucerne.

Achievements

Olympics
 1992 Summer Olympics – Silver medal, Women's Quadruple sculls
 1996 Summer Olympics – Gold medal, Women's Lwt Double sculls
 2000 Summer Olympics – Gold medal, Women's Lwt Double sculls
 2004 Summer Olympics – Gold medal, Women's Lwt Double sculls
 2008 Summer Olympics - Bronze medal, Women's Eights

World Rowing Championships
 1995 – 11th Place, Women's Open Single scull
 1999 – 1st Place, Women's Lwt Double sculls
 2001 – 2nd Place, Women's Lwt Single scull
 2003 – 3rd Place, Women's Lwt Double sculls

References

External links 
 
 
 
 

1971 births
Living people
People from Călărași County
Rowers at the 1992 Summer Olympics
Rowers at the 1996 Summer Olympics
Rowers at the 2000 Summer Olympics
Rowers at the 2004 Summer Olympics
Rowers at the 2008 Summer Olympics
Romanian female rowers
Olympic rowers of Romania
Olympic gold medalists for Romania
Olympic silver medalists for Romania
Olympic bronze medalists for Romania
Olympic medalists in rowing
Medalists at the 2008 Summer Olympics
Medalists at the 2004 Summer Olympics
World Rowing Championships medalists for Romania
Medalists at the 2000 Summer Olympics
Medalists at the 1996 Summer Olympics
Medalists at the 1992 Summer Olympics
European Rowing Championships medalists